Jarosława Jóźwiakowska, later Jarosława Bieda (born January 20, 1937 in Poznań) is a Polish athlete who mainly competed in the high jump.

She competed for Poland at the 1960 Summer Olympics held in Rome, Italy in the high jump where she won the silver medal jointly with Dorothy Shirley. At the 1964 Summer Olympics in Tokyo she ended up in 10th place.

She won a bronze medal at the 1966 European Championships in Budapest.

References

Sports Reference

1937 births
Polish female high jumpers
Athletes (track and field) at the 1960 Summer Olympics
Athletes (track and field) at the 1964 Summer Olympics
Olympic athletes of Poland
Olympic silver medalists for Poland
Living people
Sportspeople from Poznań
European Athletics Championships medalists
Medalists at the 1960 Summer Olympics
Olympic silver medalists in athletics (track and field)
Universiade medalists in athletics (track and field)
Universiade bronze medalists for Poland
Medalists at the 1959 Summer Universiade